The 1981 2. divisjon was a Norwegian second-tier football league season.

The league was contested by 24 teams, divided into two groups; A and B. Both groups consisted of 12 teams. The winners of group A and B were promoted to the 1982 1. divisjon. The second placed teams in group A and B met the 10th best finisher in 1. divisjon in a qualification round where the winner was promoted to 1. divisjon. The bottom three teams in both groups were relegated to the 3. divisjon.

Mjøndalen won group A with 31 points. Sogndal won group B with 31 points. Both teams promoted to the 1982 1. divisjon. The second-placed teams, Pors and Molde met Brann in the promotion play-offs. Molde won the qualification round on goal difference and won promotion.

Tables

Group A

Group B

Promotion play-offs

Results
Molde – Pors 3–1
Pors – Brann 2–1
Brann – Molde 3–2

Molde won the qualification round and was promoted to the 1. divisjon.

Play-off table

References

Norwegian First Division seasons
1981 in Norwegian football
Norway
Norway